Duck Lake is a lake located by Spring Lake, New York, United States. Fish species present in the lake are pickerel, largemouth bass, pumpkinseed sunfish, tiger muskie, northern pike, black bullhead, bluegill, black crappie, and yellow perch. There is public access with fee at Duck Lake Campground. .

References

Lakes of Cayuga County, New York
Lakes of New York (state)